Farmington Township is one of seventeen townships in Cedar County, Iowa, USA.  As of the 2000 census, its population was 2,137.

Geography
According to the USGS, it contains one cemetery, Farmington.

References

External links
 US-Counties.com
 City-Data.com

Townships in Cedar County, Iowa
Townships in Iowa